Qi County, or Qixian, may refer to three counties in the People's Republic of China:

Qi County, Kaifeng, Henan
Qi County, Hebi, Henan
Qi County, Shanxi

See also
Qi (disambiguation)